The Naval Battle of Aceh was fought in 1569 off the coast of Sumatra between a lone Portuguese carrack (nau, in Portuguese) and an armada of the Sultanate of Aceh, that was about to stage an attack on Portuguese Malacca. It ended in Portuguese victory and the withdrawal of the Aceh fleet after suffering heavy losses.

Background
In the beginning of May 1569, a privately owned carrack, escorted by a heavily armed galleon, departed from Goa, bound for south-east Asia. The captain and owner of the carrack was a wealthy man called Mem Lopes Carrasco, while the captain of the galleon was João Gago de Andrade, tasked with resupplying and reinforcing the Portuguese garrison in the fortress of Ternate in the Moluccas. Carrasco intended to sail his ship to the Sunda Strait, possibly to buy high-quality pepper and sandalwood, among other highly valuable products made in the region. After passing by the Cape Comorin in the southernmost tip of India and the threat of pirates lessened, the carrack left the galleon's protection and sailed at full speed away from its sight. Upon passing by northwestern Sumatra where the Sultanate of Aceh was located, the wind suddenly dropped, leaving the carrack moving at a very slow pace. Aceh was a staunch enemy of the Portuguese, and frequently harassed the shipping of Malacca and was at that time outfitting an armada with which to attack the city. It was composed of 20 galleys, 20 war junks, and over 200 craft of smaller dimension.

Battle
Upon sighting the lone carrack, the fleet immediately sailed forth out of the harbour of Aceh in the carrack's pursuit. According to the 16th century Portuguese historian Diogo do Couto:

The battle lasted all day, until the armada retreated by nightfall and dropped anchor in sight of the carrack. The Portuguese took the opportunity to take care of their wounded and make repairs on the ship all throughout the night. By the following morning, the battle resumed, as the armada sailed to board the carrack:

Aftermath

The armada of Aceh retreated with forty fewer ships "and the remaining so severely damaged" that the Acehnese called off the attack on Malacca at that time.

João Gago provided Mem Lopes Carrasco with the materials to build improvised masts so they could proceed to Malacca. He then left the carrack behind, possibly outraged that Carrasco had left him after passing the Cape Comorin. Upon arriving in Malacca however, the Captain of the fortress ordered Gago to immediately sail back and escort them the rest of the away, whereupon the surviving passengers were given a triumphant reception in the city. The carrack was so damaged that Mem Lopes Carrasco gave up on his plans to proceed to the Sunda strait and returned to India as quickly as possible. Upon hearing of Carrasco's feat in Lisbon, King Sebastian of Portugal awarded him the title of nobleman and membership in the Order of Christ, along with a generous yearly sum of money.

The Sultan of Aceh in the meantime was so affronted by such a humiliating defeat that according to Couto, he "took his vengeance on his own men, which he couldn't on the Portuguese".

References

Aceh (1569)
Conflicts in 1569
1569 in Asia